"Han jobbar i affär" is a song performed by Lena Philipsson on the 2005 album "Jag ångrar ingenting". It was written by Anders Hansson and Orup.

Single
The single was released on 30 November 2005, peaking at 9th position at the Swedish singles chart.

Single track listing
"Han jobbar i affär" - 3:50 
"Han jobbar i affär" (instrumental version) - 3:48

Chart performance
The song was tested for Svensktoppen, where it stayed for 16 weeks between 18 December 2005-, peaking at third position before leaving the chart.

The song was tested for Trackslistan, entering at 19th position on 17 December 2005, before being knocked out the next week.

Charts

References

External links
 Information at Svensk mediedatabas

2005 singles
2005 songs
Lena Philipsson songs
Songs written by Anders Hansson (songwriter)
Songs written by Orup
Song recordings produced by Anders Hansson
Sony Music singles
Swedish-language songs